Nick Gardewine (born August 15, 1993) is an American professional baseball pitcher who is a free agent. He has played in Major League Baseball (MLB) for the Texas Rangers.

Amateur career
Gardewine attended Effingham High School in Effingham, Illinois, and graduated in 2012. He played for the school's baseball team as a pitcher and finished his senior year with an 8–1 win–loss record, a 0.76 earned run average (ERA), and 74 strikeouts in 55 innings pitched. He then enrolled at Kaskaskia College and pitched for the school's baseball team in the National Junior College Athletic Association for one season. He had a 2.12 ERA, and threw a no-hitter in a game against Lake Land College, helping his team reach the JUCO World Series.

Professional career

Texas Rangers
The Texas Rangers selected Gardewine in the seventh round, with the 220th overall selection, of the 2013 MLB Draft. He signed with the Rangers, and pitched in Minor League Baseball for the Arizona Rangers of the Rookie-level Arizona League in 2013 where he was 3–3 with 3.21 ERA in 14 games. In 2014, Gardewine pitched for the Spokane Indians of the Class A-Short Season Northwest League, and had a 6–3 win–loss record and a 4.54 ERA. He played for the Hickory Crawdads of the Class A South Atlantic League in 2015, and had a 6–8 win–loss record and a 4.31 ERA. While pitching for Hickory, Gardewine tore his supraspinatus muscle. He rehabilitated the injury into the 2016 season, where he became a relief pitcher for the High Desert Mavericks of the Class A-Advanced California League. In 29 relief appearances for Hickory in 2016, he was 5–1 with a 2.47 ERA. Gardewine began the 2017 season with the Frisco RoughRiders of the Class AA Texas League.

The Rangers promoted Gardewine to the major leagues for the first time on August 21, 2017. Gardewine appeared in 12 games for Texas in 2017, producing a 0–0 record, and 5.63 ERA in 8 innings. 

In 2018 Gardewine appeared in 3 games for Texas, posting a 0–0 record, and 3.60 ERA in 5 innings. He appeared in 12 games for the Round Rock Express of the Triple-A Pacific Coast League, throwing 12 innings with a 2–1 record, 7.30 ERA, and 17 strikeouts in 12 games. Gardewine was placed on the AAA DL on May 17, 2018 with a right forearm strain. Gardewine spent the rest of the 2018 season rehabbing his injury and did not appear in another game. Gardewine was placed on the MLB 60-day DL from August 25 - November 2, 2018.   

In 2019, Gardewine was optioned to the Nashville Sounds of the Triple-A Pacific Coast League to open the season, and appeared in four games before being shut down for the season due to injuries. On June 8, he was designated for assignment. On June 13, he was released by Texas. On June 19, he signed a two-year minor league contract with the Rangers. Gardewine was released by the Rangers organization on June 1, 2020.

Cleburne Railroaders
On May 7, 2021, Gardewine signed with the Cleburne Railroaders of the American Association of Professional Baseball. Gardewine appeared in 1 game with Cleburne, pitching a shutout inning with 3 strikeouts.

Arizona Diamondbacks
On May 20, 2021, Gardewine’s contract was purchased by the Arizona Diamondbacks organization.

Cleburne Railroaders (second stint)
On April 29, 2022, Gardewine signed with the Cleburne Railroaders of the American Association of Professional Baseball. Gardewine appeared in 42 games for Cleburne in 2022, recording a 5-4 record and 2.72 ERA with 15 saves and 59 strikeouts in 43.0 innings pitched. On January 23, 2023, he was released by the Railroaders.

References

External links

1993 births
Living people
People from Effingham, Illinois
Baseball players from Illinois
Major League Baseball pitchers
Texas Rangers players
Kaskaskia Blue Devils baseball players
Arizona League Rangers players
Spokane Indians players
Hickory Crawdads players
High Desert Mavericks players
Frisco RoughRiders players
Round Rock Express players
Nashville Sounds players
Cleburne Railroaders players
Reno Aces players
Águilas de Mexicali players
American expatriate baseball players in Mexico